Botswana moths represent about 115 known moth species. The moths (mostly nocturnal) and butterflies (mostly diurnal) together make up the taxonomic order Lepidoptera.

This is a list of moth species which have been recorded in Botswana.

Arctiidae
Acantharctia vittata Aurivillius, 1900 
Metarctia lateritia Herrich-Schäffer, 1855 
Micralarctia punctulatum (Wallengren, 1860) 
Paralacydes destrictus Kühne, 2010 
Paralacydes jeskei (Grünberg, 1911) 
Teracotona rhodophaea (Walker, 1865)

Cossidae
Aethalopteryx atrireta (Hampson, 1910)

Crambidae
Ischnurges lancinalis (Guenée, 1854)

Geometridae
Chiasmia diarmodia (Prout, 1925) 
Chiasmia punctilinea (Prout, 1917) 
Drepanogynis cambogiaria (Guenée, 1858) 
Drepanogynis tripartita (Warren, 1898) 
Isturgia deerraria (Walker, 1861) 
Melinoessa aemonia (Swinhoe, 1904) 
Rhodophthitus atacta Prout, 1922 
Zamarada ascaphes Prout, 1925 
Zamarada deceptrix Warren, 1914 
Zamarada ilma Prout, 1922 
Zamarada pulverosa Warren, 1895 
Zeuctoboarmia sabinei (Prout, 1915)

Gracillariidae
Phyllonorycter anchistea (Vári, 1961)
Phyllonorycter grewiella (Vári, 1961)

Lasiocampidae
Pachytrina verba Zolotuhin & Gurkovich, 2009

Limacodidae
Crothaema sericea Butler, 1880

Lymantriidae
Rhypopteryx lugardi (Swinhoe, 1903)

Metarbelidae
Arbelodes sebelensis Lehmann, 2010 
Kroonia fumealis (Janse, 1925)

Noctuidae
Achaea catella Guenée, 1852 
Acontia antica Walker, 1862 
Acontia aurelia Hacker, Legrain & Fibiger, 2008 
Acontia bechuana Hacker, Legrain & Fibiger, 2010 
Acontia chrysoproctis (Hampson, 1902) 
Acontia conifrons (Aurivillius, 1879) 
Acontia discoidea Hopffer, 1857 
Acontia dispar (Walker, [1858]) 
Acontia dorothea Hacker, Legrain & Fibiger, 2008 
Acontia gratiosa Wallengren, 1856 
Acontia insocia (Walker, 1857) 
Acontia melaphora (Hampson, 1910) 
Acontia natalis (Guenée, 1852) 
Acontia porphyrea (Butler, 1898) 
Acontia simo Wallengren, 1860 
Acontia transfigurata Wallengren, 1856 
Acontia trimaculata Aurivillius, 1879 
Acontia wahlbergi Wallengren, 1856 
Adisura straminea Hampson, 1902 
Amyna punctum (Fabricius, 1794) 
Anedhella rectiradiata (Hampson, 1902) 
Asplenia melanodonta (Hampson, 1896) 
Athetis albirena (Hampson, 1902) 
Athetis melanephra Hampson, 1909 
Athetis singula (Möschler, 1883) 
Audea humeralis Hampson, 1902 
Audea melanoplaga Hampson, 1902 
Autoba admota (Felder & Rogenhofer, 1874) 
Brevipecten wolframmeyi Hacker & Fibiger, 2007 
Catamecia connectens (Hampson, 1902) 
Cerocala vermiculosa Herrich-Schäffer, [1858] 
Chalciope delta (Boisduval, 1833) 
Chrysodeixis acuta (Walker, [1858]) 
Cretonia ethiopica Hampson, 1910 
Ctenusa pallida (Hampson, 1902) 
Ctenusa varians (Wallengren, 1863) 
Cyclopera bucephalidia (Hampson, 1902) 
Cyligramma latona (Cramer, 1775) 
Eublemma rivula (Moore, 1882) 
Euphiusa harmonica (Hampson, 1902) 
Eutelia polychorda Hampson, 1902 
Feliniopsis hosplitoides (Laporte, 1979) 
Grammodes geometrica (Fabricius, 1775) 
Grammodes stolida (Fabricius, 1775) 
Heteropalpia vetusta (Walker, 1865) 
Hypopyra carneotincta (Hampson, 1913) 
Masalia galatheae (Wallengren, 1856) 
Masalia leucosticta (Hampson, 1902) 
Namangana adela (Hampson, 1902) 
Ozarba consanguis (Hampson, 1902) 
Ozarba subterminalis Hampson, 1910 
Paracroria griseotincta (Hampson, 1902) 
Pericyma atrifusa (Hampson, 1902) 
Plecopterodes moderata (Wallengren, 1860) 
Thiacidas duplicata (Grünberg, 1910) 
Thiacidas fasciata (Fawcett, 1917) 
Ulotrichopus primulina (Hampson, 1902) 
Ulotrichopus tinctipennis (Hampson, 1902)

Nolidae
Arcyophora longivalvis Guenée, 1852 
Arcyophora stalii (Wallengren, 1863) 
Blenina squamifera (Wallengren, 1860) 
Negeta luminosa (Walker, 1858) 
Risoba diplogramma Hampson, 1912

Notodontidae
Antheua aurifodinae (Distant, 1902)

Pterophoridae
Agdistis clara Arenberger, 1986

Pyralidae
Pempelia morosalis (Saalmüller, 1880)

Saturniidae
Campimoptilum kuntzei (Dewitz, 1881) 
Epiphora mythimnia (Westwood, 1849) 
Gynanisa maja (Klug, 1836) 
Heniocha marnois (Rogenhofer, 1891) 
Pseudaphelia apollinaris (Boisduval, 1847)

Sesiidae
Anaudia felderi Wallengren, 1863

Sphingidae
Polyptychoides grayii (Walker, 1856) 
Praedora leucophaea Rothschild & Jordan, 1903 
Rufoclanis numosae (Wallengren, 1860) 
Xenosphingia jansei Jordan, 1920

Thyrididae
Arniocera erythropyga (Wallengren, 1860)

Tineidae
Ceratophaga tragoptila (Meyrick, 1917) 
Monopis lamprostola Meyrick, 1918

Tortricidae
Paraeccopsis insellata (Meyrick, 1920)

Xyloryctidae
Scythris pangalactis Meyrick, 1933

References

External links 
AfroMoths

Moths
Moths
Botswana
Botswana